Belsize Park is a residential area of Hampstead in the London Borough of Camden (the inner north-west of London), England.

The residential streets are lined with mews houses and Georgian and Victorian villas. Some nearby localities are Hampstead village to the north and west, Camden Town to the south-east and Primrose Hill to the south.
There are restaurants, pubs, cafés, and independent boutiques in Belsize Village, and on Haverstock Hill and England's Lane. Hampstead Heath is close by, and Primrose Hill park is a five-minute walk from England's Lane.

Belsize Park is in the Hampstead and Kilburn constituency whose present MP is Tulip Siddiq.

The headquarters of the World Association of Girl Guides and Girl Scouts organisation is in Belsize Park.

History

The name is derived from French bel assis meaning 'well situated'. The area has many thoroughfares bearing its name: Belsize Avenue, Belsize Court, Belsize Crescent, Belsize Gardens, Belsize Grove, Belsize Lane, Belsize Mews, Belsize Park (the road), Belsize Park Gardens, Belsize Place, Belsize Square, and Belsize Terrace.

The Manor of Belsize dates back to 1317, when as a subdivision to the Manor of Hampstead it was left to the Roman Catholic monks of Westminster Abbey. The original manor consisted of a number of subdivided farms, which were rented out for income. Hence after the reformation, King Henry VIII returned the estate to the newly constituted Anglican Dean of Westminster Abbey. By 1600, including the manor house there were at least three other properties on the estate, with diplomat and courtier Sir Isaac Wake (1581 – 1632) having a substantial property built on the west side of the main London to Hampstead road. Inherited by his daughter and her husband, Charles West (1626–1687), the fifth Baron de la Warr, by 1714 it had passed through various hands into the ownership of William Paget, the 6th Baron Paget, who had a substantial formal garden constructed.

The name Belsize Park comes from the 17th-century manor house and parkland (built by Daniel O'Neill for his wife, the Countess of Chesterfield) which once stood on the site. Rebuilt in 1663, it was sublet by 1721, when the parklands opened as pleasure gardens for those looking to escape the dirt and grime of the City of London, with concerts, singing, dancing and country sports such as fishing and racing. In 1722 magistrates were instructed to act to stop riotous behaviour, although the parkland remained open until 1745. Belsize House was rebuilt in 1746, after which additional large country houses had been built on the surrounding farmlands for wealthy lawyers and merchants.

Between 1679 and 1714, the number of houses on the estate had increased from 8 to 14, and by 1808 there were still only 22 recorded. However, the formal division of the state in 1808 into eight separate lands - based on the structure of the underleases pertaining to the estates formal houses - allowed the church to maximise its income, and hence to allow additional substantial houses to be built on the lands. This income allowed the church to have Belsize House rebuilt in 1812 for additional letting income. The wealthy leaseholders soon enabled themselves to purchase the freehold from the church, allowing the accelerated development of Belsize as a Victorian country urban suburb of London. One of the new land owners George Todd redeveloped what was known as the White House in 1815 as a substantial Georgian stucco-villa with portico, and two lodges. Known as Belsize House, it was later sold to Matthew Forster (1786 – 1869) the Whig MP for Berwick-upon-Tweed as Belsize Lodge - it was demolished in 1937.

Victorian development started along the main London to Hampstead road from 1815 through the works of Edward Bliss, a self-made man who had leased and then bought the southeastern-located Newman's House lands, on the west side of Haverstock Hill north of England's Lane. Bliss not only built properties to lease out, but also allowed construction subleases. In 1829 Eton College advertised villa-sized plots on Haverstock Hill. The college then started developing an axis road to Finchley Road, naming it after Queen Adelaide. Development halted in the 1830s due to the proposal for the lines of the London and Birmingham Railway (L&BR) to be built through Belsize Park, but Eton College successfully argued via parliamentary lobbying for the railway to be tunnelled underground via Primrose Hill, which was then designed and engineered by Robert Stephenson. All the 38 houses on the Newman's House lands had been built by 1830.

The passing of the Ecclesiastical Leases Act 1842 allowed all church lands to be let on long term construction leases, which unlocked the accelerated urban development of Belsize Park. The opening in 1851 of Hampstead Road railway station on the L&BR prompted William Lund in 1852 to agree a 99-year construction sublease on the former Forsyth estate. He proposed developments to the west of Haverstock Hill, although his plans were curtailed by construction issues associated with building over both the Pond Street sewer and the L&BR tunnel. In 1852 Charles James Palmer, a Bloomsbury-based solicitor bought the lease of Belsize House. In 1853 he proposed demolition of the main house, with Daniel Tiley taking the lead role in constructing Belsize Square and associated properties. Palmer commissioned architect James Piers St Aubyn to design St Peter's Church. In 1864 the church bought-back the lease on the undeveloped backlot of the Bliss lands. Tiley gained agreement from Palmer and Eton College to buy the construction lease from the church, and hence extend development south of Belsize Square to connect with the college's estate. Mimicking the then fashionable styles of Kensington and Bayswater, between 1851 and the late 1860s he built over 250 8-10 bedroom semi-detached stucco houses with large porticos, aimed at the middle classes. The church undertook a similar agreement in 1857, reacquiring full control over the portion of Todd's lease north of Belsize Lane in 1865, and again selling it to Tiley. With construction almost complete, fashion changed and Tiley went bankrupt in 1870.

Of the original eight lands defined by the church in 1808, the three leased to Thomas Roberts remained substantially undeveloped throughout much of the Victoria era. South End Farm continued as a farmhouse, whilst although Rosslyn House was sold in 1816 to the undertenant, it remained in place with its formal gardens until the house was demolished between 1896 and 1909. In 1855 Henry Davidson exchanged his lease for life of the Rosslyn House lands for a 99-year building lease. Due to issues associated with construction over the L&BR tunnels, in 1859 he sold Rosslyn House and its extended formal gardens to Charles Henry Lardner Woodd. Woodd decided to sublease the house out for income, with its occupiers until 1893 including Sir Francis Freeling (1764 – 1836) who was Secretary of HM General Post Office, and General Sir Moore Disney. Davidson developed his part of the Rosslyn lands, undertaking a mixed development of large semi-detached properties similar to Belsize Park, slowed by a lack of labour through both the substantial development of the neighbouring Maryon Wilson land and the 1860s housing rush. Woodd endeavored to keep the ever-encroaching tide of housing from coming too close to Rosslyn House, permitting development only on the fringes of the formal garden, such as the housing by the local architect Horace Field on the south side of Wedderburn Road. It was only after Woodd's death in 1895, and the sale of the House to developers by his widow the following year, that development took place on the north side of Wedderburn Road and elsewhere on the garden and site of the House.  At 19-21 Lyndhurst Road (1898) the development incorporated the gatehouse of Rosslyn House, designed for Woodd by Teulon, the architect of St Stephen's Church, Rosslyn Hill.

Developing housing resulted in the need for facilities, including the Metropolitan Railway from 1860 (Hampstead Heath and Finchley Road), and the L&BR form 1868 (Swiss Cottage and Finchley Road). From 1873 William Willett - the father of William Willett the tireless promoter of British Summer Time, who helped his father from 1881 onwards - took over the church's leases after the bankruptcy of Daniel Tiley. Willett redeveloped much of the former Eton College estate with newer, smaller but still substantial properties inspired by Queen Anne style architecture. By 1900, most of the residual country mansions and their gardens had been demolished, now to make way for smaller terraced houses.

After World War I, the construction of blocks of flats began, and now a great many of the larger houses are also converted into flats. In World War II, a large underground air-raid shelter was built here and its entrance can still be seen near the tube station at Downside Crescent. The area on Haverstock Hill north of Belsize Park Underground station up to Hampstead Town Hall and including part of a primary school near the Royal Free Hospital was heavily bombed. When the area was rebuilt, the opportunity was taken to widen the pavement and build further back from the road.

This is not an advertising poster for Foxtons.

Cultural references
The lyrics of the international chart hit "Kayleigh" by rock band Marillion in 1985 include the line "loving on the floor in Belsize Park". It is also in the short film Les Bicyclettes de Belsize (although mainly filmed in Hampstead Village), of which the title song was covered by Mireille Mathieu, Engelbert Humperdinck, and others. Belsize Park is also referenced on Sleeper's 1995 debut album Smart in the song "Lady Love Your Countryside" with the lyrics "And we could spend our lives puking in Belsize Park". Cozy Powell's 1974 single "Na Na Na" suggests that "You're a wizard of Wembley Central, You're the J. S. Bach of Belsize park". The Belsize Park London Underground station features in the song "Paradise" by Coldplay, where in the video, the elephant can be seen taking a train from the station.

The Camden Town Group artist Robert Polhill Bevan and his wife Stanislawa de Karlowska lived at 14 Adamson Road from 1900 to 1925.

Kirsty MacColl's 2000 song "England 2 Colombia 0" features the line, "we went to a pub in Belsize Park and cheered on England as the skies grew dark..."

It is also the place of residence for the Jewish community targeted by Hitler during the Second World War in the novel The Morning Gift.

Novelist Peter Straub entitled his 1983 poetry collection "Leeson Square and Belsize Park" in part after his time in residence in the Belsize Park region of London. Belsize Park and the surrounding quarters were the setting for a long-running radio drama, Waggoner's Walk. This daily serial ran from April 1969 to May 1980 each weekday on Radio 2. Belsize Park is mentioned in the Hitchcock thriller, Dial M for Murder (1954)  by the lead character Tony Wallace played by Ray Milland when coercing his accomplice, C.A. Swann into murdering his wife.

Sport
There are records of a Belsize Park Rugby Club in North-West London since the 1860s. In 1871, Belsize was one of the clubs at the inaugural meeting of the Rugby Football Union, and therefore pioneers of the game of Rugby Union. In 1878, Belsize moved to form Rosslyn Park RFC, becoming one of England's leading clubs.  In 1971, Belsize Park RFC was re-established by a group of local players. The club is now one of the most central of all London Rugby Clubs, playing and training in Regent's Park.  There are five regular teams playing every Saturday during the season as well as a touch rugby squad in the summer time.

Notable residents
 Helena Bonham-Carter, actress, at Chalcot Gardens 
 Tim Burton, filmmaker and animator, at Chalcot Gardens
 Rita Ora, singer and songwriter, at Chalcot Gardens 
 James Agate, drama critic, at Antrim Mansions
 Walter Bergmann, émigré musician, at 28 Belsize Square
 Harold Brighouse, writer, at 67 Parliament Hill
Jonny Buckland, lead guitarist for Coldplay
 Frederick Delius, composer, in Belsize Park Gardens
 Nick Drake, musician, at 112 Haverstock Hill
 Cameron Diaz, actress, at Belsize Park
 Jude Law, actor, at Belsize Park
 John Drinkwater, poet, at 10 Belsize Square
 William Empson, poet, at 160 Haverstock Hill
 Noel Gallagher, musician and songwriter, at 8 Steele's Road
 Stella Gibbons, journalist, poet, and writer, at 33 Upper Park Road
 Hazel Hunkins Hallinan, women's rights activist
 Alice Herz-Sommer, 110-year-old Holocaust survivor
 Tom Hiddleston, actor
 Rowland Hill, inventor of the postage stamp, at Bartrams, Hampstead Green (now the site of the Royal Free Hospital car park)
 Leslie Hutchinson, singer, 31 Steele's Road
 Jerome K. Jerome, writer, at 41 Belsize Park
 E. Ray Lankester at 68 Belsize Park
 Karl Marx, 19th-century political philosopher at 41 Maitland Park Road
 Ramsay MacDonald, politician, at 9 Howitt Road
 John Maple at Bedford Lodge, 151 Haverstock Hill
 Piet Mondrian, painter, 60 Parkhill Road
 Henry Moore, sculptor, at 11A Parkhill Road
 Paul Nash, at 3 Eldon Grove
 Henry W. Nevinson, essayist, at 4 Downshire Crescent
 William Heath Strange, physician and founder of the Hampstead General Hospital, now the Royal Free Hospital, at 2 Belsize Avenue
Residents of the Isokon Flats:
Agatha Christie, writer
Naum Gabo, sculptor
Walter Gropius, architect
Nicholas Monsarrat, writer
László Moholy-Nagy, sculptor
Adrian Stokes, painter and writer

Notes and references
Notes

References

External links

 
 
 
 
 

 
Districts of the London Borough of Camden
Areas of London